Pétanque competition at the 2014 Asian Beach Games was held in Phuket, Thailand from 15 to 20 November 2014 at Patong Beach, Phuket.

Medalists

Men

Women

Mixed

Medal table

Results

Men

Shooting
17 November

Elimination round

Quarterfinal

Knockout round

Singles

Preliminary round
17 November

Knockout round
18 November

Doubles

Preliminary round
15 November

Knockout round
16 November

Triples

Preliminary round
19 November

Knockout round
20 November

Women

Shooting
17 November

Elimination round

Quarterfinal

Knockout round

Singles

Preliminary round
17 November

Knockout round
18 November

Doubles

Preliminary round
15 November

Knockout round
16 November

Triples

Preliminary round
19 November

Knockout round
20 November

Mixed

Doubles

Preliminary round
15 November

Knockout round
16 November

References

External links 
 

2014 Asian Beach Games events